The Quality Practice Award (QPA) is given to general practitioner medical practices in the United Kingdom in recognition of high quality patient care by all members of staff. It is awarded by the Royal College of General Practitioners (RCGP).

For the practice to achieve the award, evidence has to be provided that conforms to set criteria in the following areas:
 Practice Profile
 Availability
 Clinical Care
 Communication
 Continuity of Care
 Equipment and Minor Surgery
 Health Promotion
 Information Technology
 Medical Records
 Nursing and Midwifery
 Practice Management
 Other Professional Staff
 Patient Issues
 Premises
 Prescribing/Repeat Prescribing
 The Practice as a Learning Organisation

After the evidence is completed, an onsite visit during a normal working day is made, to assess the practice and interview staff.

External links
 Information from the RCGP's website

British awards
General practice